Evangelia Andreadaki (Greek: Ευαγγελία Ανδρεαδάκη) is a Greek actress.  She is sometimes credited as Vangelio Andreadaki.  Her film credits include Smac, Little England and Black Field.  Andreadaki also co-starred in the television series Eho ena mystiko.

Filmography (partial)

References

External links 
 

Living people
Actresses from Athens
Greek film actresses
Greek television actresses
Year of birth missing (living people)